SUISA ("SUISse Auteurs") is the collecting society for Swiss songwriters, composers and music publishers. It undertakes collective rights management for its members in order to collect license fees when their musical works are performed in public, broadcast or transmitted, and to pay out performing royalties.  It was formed in 1923.  It is also the administrative body for the CAE number.

External links
 

Music organisations based in Switzerland
Music licensing organizations